The Commentary on the Water Classic, or Commentaries on the Water Classic,  commonly known as Shui Jing Zhu, is a work on the Chinese geography in ancient times, describing the traditional understanding of its waterways and ancient canals, compiled by Li Daoyuan during the Northern Wei Dynasty (386-534 AD). The book is divided into sections by river, each described with its source, course, and major tributaries, including cultural and historical notes. 

The work is much expanded from its source text, the older (and now lost) Water Classic (Shuijing 水經). The original text described 137 different rivers in China and was traditionally credited to Eastern Han scholar and geographer Sang Qin (桑钦) during the Three Kingdoms Period (220-280 AD).  Qing dynasty scholars gave it a later date (during the Three Kingdoms Period) because of the names of the counties and commanderies.  Its authorship was then attributed to Jin dynasty scholar Guo Pu. Li Daoyuan's 40-volume, 300,000-character version includes 1252 rivers.

Although very thorough for its time, it did repeat the earlier mistake of the "Tribute of Yu" in viewing the Min as the headwaters of the Yangtze. It was not until the Ming dynasty that Xu Xiake correctly listed the Jinsha as the principal source.

See also
Yang Shoujing and Xiong Huizhen, authors of the 19th-century annotation Shui Jing Zhu Shu (水經註疏)

References

Further reading
Needham, Joseph (1986). Science and Civilization in China: Volume 3. Taipei: Caves Books, Ltd.
Strassberg, Richard E.: Inscribed Landscapes: Travel Writing from Imperial China. University of California Press, Berkeley, Calif. 1994 
Cihai, Shanghai cishu chubanshe, Shanghai 2002,

External links

"Chinese Literature: Shuijingzhu 水經注 "Commentary to the River Classic" " at China Knowledge
"Unter dem Himmel" 

Chinese literature
Geographic history of China
Chinese geography texts